Roccalumera is a comune (municipality) in the Metropolitan City of Messina in the Italian region Sicily, located about  east of Palermo and about  southwest of Messina.

Roccalumera borders the following municipalities: Fiumedinisi, Furci Siculo, Mandanici, Nizza di Sicilia, Pagliara.

References

External links
 Official website

Cities and towns in Sicily

www.parcoquasimodo.it